Ma'bar (Arabic: مَعْبَر) or Ma'bar Coast is an area of the southeastern coast of India. The term is used to refer to the entire coastal zone of the Indian state Tamil Nadu. Ma'bar is also used to refer to the Madurai Sultanate

References

Regions of India
Landforms of Tamil Nadu
Coasts of India
Regions of Tamil Nadu